Mattia Vitale (born 1 October 1997) is an Italian professional footballer who plays as a midfielder for  club Crotone.

Club career

Juventus
A native of Bologna, Vitale joined the youth set-up of local club Bologna, playing as a forward, before moving north to Turin giants Juventus in 2011. He was first included in a matchday squad on 11 January 2015, remaining an unused substitute for their 3–1 Serie A win away to Napoli. The player made his professional debut on 11 April against Parma, replacing fellow youngster Kingsley Coman for the final ten minutes of a 0–1 away defeat, becoming Juve's youngest debutant since Nicola Zanini in 1991. On 9 May, he played his first match at the Juventus Stadium, replacing Roberto Pereyra for the final 15 minutes of a 1–1 draw with Cagliari.

Lanciano (loan) 
In 2016, he joined Serie B club Lanciano on a six-month loan, recording 19 league appearances and an assist.

Cesena (loan) 
On 6 July 2016, Cesena announced the loan signing of Vitale from Juventus for the 2016–2017 season.

SPAL

Carpi (loan)
On 15 January 2019 he joined Carpi on loan for the rest of the 2018–19 season.

Frosinone
On 16 July 2019 he joined Frosinone on loan. As certain performance conditions were met, Frosinone was obligated to purchase his rights at the end of the 2019–20 season.

Pro Vercelli
On 31 August 2021, he joined Serie C club Pro Vercelli.

Crotone
On 19 July 2022, Vitale signed a three-year contract with Crotone.

Honours 
Juventus
Supercoppa Italiana: 2015

References

External links 
Profile on Italian Football Federation official website 

1997 births
Living people
Footballers from Bologna
Italian footballers
Association football midfielders
Serie A players
Serie B players
Serie C players
Juventus F.C. players
S.S. Virtus Lanciano 1924 players
A.C. Cesena players
Venezia F.C. players
S.P.A.L. players
A.C. Carpi players
Frosinone Calcio players
F.C. Pro Vercelli 1892 players
F.C. Crotone players
Italy youth international footballers